The 2018–19 All-Ireland Senior Club Hurling Championship was the 49th staging of the All-Ireland Senior Club Hurling Championship, the Gaelic Athletic Association's premier inter-county club hurling tournament. The championship began on 28 October 2018 and ended on 17 March 2019.

Cuala of Dublin were the defending champions. They were eliminated by Kilmacud Crokes in the semi-final of the 2018 Dublin Championship.

On 17 March 2019, Ballyhale Shamrocks won the championship following a 2-28 to 2-11 defeat of St. Thomas's in the All-Ireland final. This was their seventh All-Ireland title overall and their first title since 2015.

Ballygunner's Pauric Mahony was the championship's top scorer with 1-42.

Competition format

County Championships

The top hurling teams in Ireland's counties compete in their senior club championship. Each county decides the format for determining their county champions – it can be knockout, double-elimination, league, etc or a combination.

Only single club teams are allowed to enter the All-Ireland Club championship. If a team which is an amalgamation of two or more clubs, a divisional team or a university team wins a county's championship, a single club team will represent that county in the provincial championship as determined by that county's championship rules. Normally it is the club team that exited the county championship at the highest stage.

Provincial Championships

Leinster, Munster and Ulster organise a provincial championship for their participating county champions. Connacht discontinued their senior club championship after 2007 but they do organise intermediate and junior championships. The Galway champions represent Connacht in the All-Ireland senior club semi-finals as Galway club hurling is at higher level than the hurling in the other four Connacht counties.

Some Leinster, Munster and Ulster counties also enter their senior champions in the All-Ireland intermediate club championship (tier 2) as it is recognised that club hurling is weak in those counties.

All matches are knock-out. Two ten minute periods of extra time are played each way if it's a draw at the end of normal time in all matches including the final. If the score is still level after extra time the match is replayed.

All-Ireland

The two semi-finals are usually played on a Saturday in early February. The All-Ireland final is traditionally played in Croke Park on St. Patrick's Day, the 17th of March.

All matches are knock-out. Two ten minute periods of extra time are played each way if it's a draw at the end of normal time in the semi-finals or final. If the score is still level after extra time the match is replayed.

Initial Schedule

County championships April 2018 to November 2018
Provincial championships October 2018 to December 2018
All-Ireland semi-finals early February 2019
All-Ireland final 17 March 2019

County Finals

Connacht County Finals

Galway Senior Hurling Championships:

 St. Thomas's 2-13

 Liam Mellows 0-10

Leinster County Finals

Carlow Senior Hurling Championships:

 Mount Leinster Rangers 3-10

  St. Mullin's 1-13

Dublin Senior Hurling Championships:

 Kilmacud Crokes 1-20 R 1-15

 Ballyboden St Endas 2-17 R 2-15

Kilkenny Senior Hurling Championships:

 Ballyhale2-20

 Bennettsbridge 2-17

Laois Senior Hurling Championships:

 Rathdowney-Errill 0-19

 Camross 2-15

Offaly Senior Hurling Championships:

 Coolderry 2-17

 Kilcormac-Killoughey 0-17

 
Westmeath Senior Hurling Championships:

 Clonkill 1-13

 Raharney 2-09

Wexford Senior Hurling Championships:

 St. Martin's 0-13

 Naomh Éanna, Gorey  2-11

Munster County Finals

Cork Senior Hurling Championships:

As Imokilly are a divisional team, Midleton proceeded to the Munster Club Championship.	

 Imokilly 4-19

 Midleton 1-18

Clare Senior Hurling Championships:

 Ballyea 1-20

 Cratloe 1-14

Limerick Senior Hurling Championships:

 Na Piarsaigh 2-22

 Doon 3-10

Tipperary Senior Hurling Championships:

 Nenagh Éire Óg 2-13

 Clonoulty-Rossmore 0-23

Waterford Senior Hurling Championships:

 Ballygunner 2-19

 Abbeyside 0-13

Ulster County Finals

Antrim Senior Hurling Championships:

 Ruairí Óg, Cushendall

 Loughgiel Shamrocks

Derry Senior Hurling Championships:

 Slaughtneil 2-18

 Banagher 0-14

Down Senior Hurling Championships:

 Ballycran 2-13

 Portaferry 1-14

Team Summaries

Provincial championships

Leinster Senior Club Hurling Championship

Quarter-finals

Semi-finals

Final

Munster Senior Club Hurling Championship

Quarter-final

Semi-finals

Final

Ulster Senior Club Hurling Championship

Semi-final

Final

All-Ireland Senior Club Hurling Championship

All-Ireland Semi-finals

The Leinster, Munster and Ulster champions qualify for the All-Ireland semi-finals. The Galway champions represent Connacht and enter the competition at the semi-final stage.

All-Ireland final

2018-19 Club Hurler of the Year

Adrian Mullen (Ballyhale Shamrocks)

Championship statistics

Top scorers

Top scorer overall

Top scorers in a single game

Miscellaneous
 Ruairí Óg, Cushendall became the most successful team in the history of the Ulster Championship after winning their 11th title following a defeat of Ballycran in the final.
 Na Piarsaigh suffered their first ever defeat in the Munster Championship when they were defeated by Ballygunner.
 Ballygunner won the Munster Championship title for the first time since 2001.

References

2018 in hurling
2019 in hurling
All-Ireland Senior Club Hurling Championship